The German African Party (in German: Deutsche Afrikanische Partei) was a small anti-Nazi political party which existed in South West Africa (currently Namibia) from the 1930s through the 1950s.

The German African Party was created on February 8, 1939 by Martin Maier as a result of political tensions within a rightist conservative party named Deutscher Südwest-Bund (DSWB) (or “German Southwest Union”), currently disappeared as well. Like the German Nazi Party (National-Sozialistische Deutsche Arbeiter Partei -NSDAP-, or “National-Socialist Party of the German Workers”), all of these parties were overtly racist, as they only accepted members with German ancestry.

References

NAMIBIA LIBRARY OF DR. KLAUS DIERKS:
Political parties and organisations.
(http://www.klausdierks.com/).

Defunct political parties in Namibia
German-Namibian culture
Anti-fascist organizations